Podłaźniczka, polazňička is Polish and Slovakian Christmas decoration. It was usually made of the top of a conifer tree turned upside down, which was then decorated with tissue paper, candies, apples, nuts, or typical Polish worlds, or of straw. This decoration was then hung over the Vigil table or in a corner. It was supposed to bring luck and prosperity to the household. Podłaźniczka originates from the tradition of połaźnik.

In Serbia, such a branch was called šumka od položenjca, or polaznikova šumka.

History 

The custom of podłaźniczka is related to the custom of the połaźnik. Podlaznik was the first guest to visit a house on Christmas Day. The arrival of a healthy, young, and happy person was supposed to bring luck to the household. Podlaznik often brought with him green twigs, which in Poland were called podłaźniczki. A similar custom of bringing evergreen plants by podlaznik existed also in Slovakia and Bulgaria; in Lemkos, the didok was brought home, and in Bulgaria, in addition to twigs, straw was also brought.

The name of the ritual person was transferred to the object associated with that ritual, but this process rarely occurred in South Slavs.

In Poland 

The podłaźniczka was also called połaźniczka, połaźnik, podłaźnik, podłaźnica, jutka, sad, sad rajski, boże drzewko, rajskie drzewko, wiecha, gaik.

In Poland, the podłaźniczka was known mainly in the Goral Lands. The podłaźniczka was made in various ways, it could be a conifer tree, or conifer tree treetop turned upside down, a branch of a conifer, or a riddle (przetak) ring to which green twigs were attached. So prepared decoration was attached to the beam,  often directly above the Christmas table, or in a sacred corner. Podłaźniczka is considered to be the prototype of modern Christmas tree in Poland.

The podłaźniczka plant was supposed to bring prosperity to the household, protect the animals from wolves and plague, protect them from diseases and murrain.

They were usually decorated with hand-made decorations made of tissue paper or colored paper. They were also decorated with the so-called światy "worlds", which were pieces of christmas wafer joined together. The wafer was used to make various shapes, such as crosses, suns, crescents, etc.; they were also often colored. They were made on the day of Christmas Eve, which gave rise to another name for this ornament: wilijki. Sometimes the światy became an independent decoration, in which case they were hung under the ceiling beam. Moreover, the podłaźniczka was decorated with candies, apples, cookies, nuts, or gilded flax seeds, and after World War II also with baubles. Before the appearance of the modern Christmas tree straw a pająk "spider" was a similar decoration.

W Slovakia 
In Slovakia, the ornament called polazňička was also known – it was a straw hen (e.g. in the upper Spiš region, where it was hung over the Christmas table), which symbolically corresponded to a green conifer ornament, Christmas tree, or a branch of coniferous tree brought by a polaznik. This was also the name of the ritual Christmas bread. In the Slovak-Moravian borderland, polazňička was called "happiness", which is related to the Polish belief that podłaźniczka brings good luck.

Gallery

See also 

 Didukh
 Badnjak
 Koliada
 Saturnalia
 Yule

References

Bibliography 

 
 
 
 
 
 
 
 
 
 

Polish traditions
Slovak traditions
Christmas in Poland
Christmas traditions
Christmas decorations
Christmas trees